The name Norbert has been used for five tropical cyclones in the Eastern Pacific Ocean:
 Hurricane Norbert (1984) – took an erratic track several hundred miles south of Baja California, making landfall there
 Hurricane Norbert (1990) – stayed at sea
 Hurricane Norbert (2008) – struck Baja California
 Hurricane Norbert (2014) – a Category 3 that affected Western Mexico and the Baja California Peninsula
 Tropical Storm Norbert (2020) – never threatened land

Pacific hurricane set index articles